This is a list of dance in China.

See also 

 Dance in China
 History of Chinese dance

References 

 
Arts in China